The Committee for Infrastructure is a Northern Ireland Assembly committee established to advise, assist and scrutinise the work of the Department for Infrastructure. The committee also plays a key role in the consultation, consideration and development of new legislation.

Until 2016, the committee was called the Committee for Regional Development.

Membership

See also 
 Committee

References

External links 
 Committee for Regional Development

Northern Ireland Assembly
Committees